Eucalyptol is a monoterpenoid.  A colorless liquid, it is a bicyclic ether. Eucalyptol has a fresh mint-like smell and a spicy, cooling taste.  It is insoluble in water, but miscible with organic solvents. Eucalyptol makes up ~70–90% of eucalyptus oil. Eucalyptol forms crystalline adducts with hydrohalic acids, o-cresol, resorcinol, and phosphoric acid. Formation of these adducts is useful for purification.

In 1870, F. S. Cloez identified and ascribed the name "eucalyptol" to the dominant portion of Eucalyptus globulus oil.

Uses
Because of its pleasant, spicy aroma and taste, eucalyptol is used in flavorings, fragrances, and cosmetics. Cineole-based eucalyptus oil is used as a flavouring at low levels (0.002%) in various products, including baked goods, confectionery, meat products, and beverages. In a 1994 report released by five top cigarette companies, eucalyptol was listed as one of the 599 additives to cigarettes. It is claimed to be added to improve the flavor.

Eucalyptol is an ingredient in commercial mouthwashes, and has been used in traditional medicine as a cough suppressant.

Other
Eucalyptol exhibits insecticidal and insect repellent properties.

In contrast, eucalyptol is one of many compounds that are attractive to males of various species of orchid bees, which gather the chemical to synthesize pheromones; it is commonly used as bait to attract and collect these bees for study. One such study with Euglossa imperialis, a nonsocial orchid bee species, has shown that the presence of cineole (also eucalyptol) elevates territorial behavior and specifically attracts the male bees. It was even observed that these males would periodically leave their territories to forage for chemicals such as cineole, thought to be important for attracting and mating with females, to synthesize pheromones.

Toxicology
It has low toxicity (hence its use in foods), with an LD50 of 2.48 g/kg (rabbits).

List of plants that contain eucalyptol

 Aframomum corrorima
 Artemisia tridentata
 Cannabis
 Cinnamomum camphora, camphor laurel (50%)
 Eucalyptus cneorifolia
 Eucalyptus dives
 Eucalyptus dumosa
 Eucalyptus globulus
 Eucalyptus goniocalyx
 Eucalyptus horistes
 Eucalyptus kochii
 Eucalyptus leucoxylon
 Eucalyptus largiflorens 
 Eucalyptus oleosa
 Eucalyptus polybractea
 Eucalyptus radiata
 Eucalyptus rossii
 Eucalyptus salmonophloia
 Eucalyptus sideroxylon Eucalyptus smithii Eucalyptus staigeriana Eucalyptus tereticornis Eucalyptus viridis Eucalyptus wandoo 
 Hedychium coronarium, butterfly lily
 Helichrysum gymnocephalum Kaempferia galanga, galangal, (5.7%)
 Laurus nobilis, bay laurel, (45%)
 Melaleuca alternifolia, tea tree, (0–15%)
 Salvia lavandulifolia, Spanish sage (13%)
 Turnera diffusa, damiana
 Umbellularia californica, pepperwood (22.0%)
 Zingiber officinale'', ginger

Compendial status
 British Pharmacopoeia
 Martindale: The Extra Pharmacopoeia 31

N.B. Listed as "cineole" in some pharmacopoeias.

See also
 Camphor
 Citral
 Eucalyptus oil
 Lavandula
 Menthol
 Mouthwash

References

Further reading

External links 
 
 
 

Cooling flavors
Monoterpenes
Ethers